Q'asaqucha (Quechua q'asa mountain pass, qucha lake, "mountain pass lake", hispanicized spelling Casacocha) is a lake in Peru located in the Lima Region, Huaura Province, Santa Leonor District. It is situated south of the mountain Qata Warillu (Catahuarillo).

References

Lakes of Peru
Lakes of Lima Region